Gabriel Cattand (29 November 1923 – 9 August 1997) was a French actor. He appeared in 108 films and television shows between 1950 and 1997. He starred in the 1969 film Klann – grand guignol, which was entered into the 20th Berlin International Film Festival.

Partial filmography

 The Bread Peddler (1950) – Georges Darier aka Georges Fortier
 Pigalle-Saint-Germain-des-Prés (1950) – Le poète Jean-Pierre Francis
 Women's Prison (1958) – L'avocat
 Cause toujours, mon lapin (1961)
 Laissez tirer les tireurs (1964) – Le colonel (uncredited)
 3 Avengers (1964) – (French version, voice)
 Maroc 7 (1967) – Bit Part (uncredited)
 Réseau secret (1967) – Von Braun
 Klann – grand guignol (1969) – Klann
 Céleste (1970) – Me Moret
 Repeated Absences (1972) – Le flic
 Shock Treatment (1973) – Procureur de Boissière
 Le gang des otages (1973) – Charles Aubrey
 Rude journée pour la reine (1973) – Monsieur Flatters
 Stavisky (1974) – Un député à la commission d'enquête
 Touch Me Not (1974) – Harry
 The Story of O (1975) – The commander
 Lovers Like Us (1975)
 La situation est grave... mais pas désespérée (1976) – Philippe de Valrude
 Blue jeans (1977) – Mr. Lawn
 Servant and Mistress (1977) – Charles
 Armaguedon (1977) – Jimmy Laurent – L'animateur de 'Welcome la vie'
 Fire's Share (1978) – William de Wallier, le banquier
 Cause toujours... tu m'intéresses! (1979) – Le chirurgien
 La gueule de l'autre (1979) – (uncredited)
 I... comme Icare (1979) – Le président Marc Jarry
 Jupiter's Thigh (1980) – Le maire
 Julien Fontanes, magistrat (1981, TV Series) – René de Senover, le libraire
 Les Maîtres du temps (1982) – Pirate (voice)
 Le démon dans l'île (1983) – Henry Garland – le pharmacien
 Le Marginal (1983) – Contrôleur Dumas
 Paris minuit (1986) – Commissaire Belland
 Les oreilles entre les dents (1987) – Théron
 Life and Nothing But (1989) – Professeur Mortier
 Le secret de Sarah Tombelaine (1991) – Bourjois
 The Accompanist (1992) – Parisian Impresario

References

External links

1923 births
1997 deaths
People from Bonneville, Haute-Savoie
French male film actors
French male television actors
20th-century French male actors